World Circuit can mean:

 World Circuit (record label), a famous world music record label.
 Formula One Grand Prix (video game), a racing simulator video game known as "World Circuit" in the US.